45 class may refer to:

British Rail Class 45
DRG Class 45
New South Wales 45 class locomotive